The Alfa Romeo 90 (Type 162A) is an executive car produced by Italian car manufacturer Alfa Romeo between 1984 and 1987.

History

Designed by Bertone and introduced at the 1984 Turin Motor Show, the 90 was pitched between the Alfa Romeo Giulietta (nuova) and the Alfa Romeo Alfa 6, both of which were soon discontinued after the 90's launch. The car used the Alfetta chassis (including its rear mounted transaxle) and took its engines from the larger Alfa 6. The bodywork was similar to both, albeit modernised. One notable feature of the 90's design was a small chin spoiler which extended above a certain speed to aid engine cooling. The cars design was conservative, inside and out, with perhaps the only unusual element being the U-shaped parking brake lever.

The 90 was well equipped, including electric front windows and electrically adjustable seats as standard. The luxurious Gold Cloverleaf (Quadrifoglio Oro) model had electric rear windows, a trip computer, power steering, central locking, metallic paint and a digital instrument panel as standard. The passenger fascia included a slot for an optional briefcase, made by Valextra. The external finish was very similar across the board, it being near impossible to tell the different models apart from appearance alone.

The 90 was revamped in 1986 with many minor changes throughout, the most obvious exterior change being a new grille with smaller horizontal slants. A total of 56,428 cars were sold over the four years of production.

The 90 was made only as a sedan but in 1985 Carrozzeria Marazzi developed an Alfa 90 Station Wagon prototype at the behest of Italian motoring magazine Auto Capital; only two cars were made.

Suspension
The Alfa 90 has a longitudinal front engine, a rear mounted gearbox with differential lock and independent front suspension wishbones with torsion bar springs and rear De Dion tube. It has disc brakes on all four wheels, the rear brakes are mounted inboard.

Engines
Five engines were available: two Alfa Romeo Twin Cam engines; 1,779 cc and 1,962 cc and two fuel injected Alfa Romeo V6 engines: 1,996 cc or 2,492 cc, and finally a 2,393 cc turbodiesel made by VM Motori. The carburetted fours have twin Dell'Ortos with manual chokes, while the 1,962 cc was also available in a fuel injected model which also incorporated a novel variable valve timing system. The fuel injected engine has the same maximum power but offered somewhat less torque; this was perhaps more than made up for with a 20 percent improvement in fuel economy.

The 2.0 V6 version was dedicated to the Italian market, where up to 1993 cars with engines over 2.0-litres were subjected to a doubled 38% VAT. It was equipped with an innovative engine control unit and electronic injection system named CEM (Controllo Elettronico del Motore), developed by Alfa Romeo subsidiary SPICA. It manages the opening time of the injectors and the ignition depending on the angle of the butterfly valves, with one throttle body per cylinder unlike on the Bosch L-Jetronic used on the 2.5 V6. V6 cars receive a double-plate clutch while the four-cylinders rely on a single-plate unit.

Today
Practical Classics, a well-known classic car magazine, reported that only 10 Alfa Romeo 90s remain on British roads. As of June 2014, only one, a Gold Cloverleaf, is licensed with the DVLA, with a further eight on SORN.

References

External links

The International Alfa 90 Register

90
Bertone vehicles
Executive cars
Sedans
Rear-wheel-drive vehicles
Cars introduced in 1984
Cars discontinued in 1987